Wilhelm Mülhens (born 25 June 1762 in Troisdorf and died 6 March 1841 in Köln) was a Cologne perfume designer and manufacturer, and the founder of the Mülhens company, famous for the fragrance "4711".

Life and work 
Wilhelm Mühlens was the sixth of eleven children of Jakob Mülhens and his wife Anna, née Volberg. His life prior to 1796 is not well known.

In 1803 Carlo Farina, who was not part of the famous cologne-producing family, fraudulently sold William Mülhens that family's naming rights.

In 1805 Mühlens was first recorded as a cologne manufacturer, later sold under the product name 4711 from 1881. After the Napoleonic wars his company also exported the cologne abroad, including Paris and Stralsund.

In 1832 Wilhelm Mülhens was found guilty of abusing the name "Farina", and the 1803 contract was found to be void.
To continue operating under the name "Farina" in 1832 Wilhelm Mühlens son, Peter Joseph Mülhens, took on a Farina from Mortara as a partner in the company for "office work and supervision of fabrication."

References 

1762 births
1841 deaths
People from Troisdorf
Perfumers
19th-century German inventors
Perfume houses
18th-century German businesspeople
19th-century German businesspeople
Businesspeople from Cologne